John Kenneth McLean (3 October 1923 – 30 July 2005) was a New Zealand rugby union and professional rugby league footballer who played in the 1940s and 1950s.

Background
Jack McLean was born in Thames, New Zealand, and he died aged 81 in Thames, New Zealand.

Rugby union career
He played five matches for the All Blacks including two internationals, both of which were against Australia.

Rugby league career

Bradford Northern
McLean was a member of the Bradford Northern's table topping side and championship finalists of 1952, and a Yorkshire Cup winner in 1954, he scored 63 tries in 46 games in the 1951–52 season, and is the top try scorer of all time with Bradford Northern (now named the Bradford Bulls).

Championship final appearances
McLean played , i.e. number 5, in Bradford Northern's 6–13 defeat by Wigan in the Championship Final during the 1951–52 season at Leeds Road, Huddersfield on Saturday 10 May 1952.

References

External links
Search for "McLean" at rugbyleagueproject.org
J McLean Statistics at rugbyleagueproject.org (RL)
The Millennium Masters – Backs
Team Of The Century
King Country All Blacks – John McLean
Photograph "Jack McLean – Jack McLean, a Kiwi wingman, was one of the greatest wingmen to play for Bradford. He scored 261 tries in 221 games including an incredible 63 tries in the 1951/52 season. – 01/01/1952" at rlhp.co.uk
Photograph "Jack McLean scores – Jack McLean scores against Halifax at Thrum Hall in the Championship Semi final of 1953. Halifax went on to win a tight affair by 18-16. – 02/05/1953" at rlhp.co.uk
Photograph "Bill Seddon races away – Bill Seddon, Northern's Kiwi centre, races away in this game against Featherstone with Jack McLean in support. – 05/11/1955" at rlhp.co.uk
Photograph "Joe Phillips makes a break – Joe Phillips, the attacking Kiwi full back, who played for Bradford Northern between 1950 and 1956 amassing a massive 1,463 points including 661 goals. He once score 14 goals in a single game against Batley in 1952. – 01/01/1955" at rlhp.co.uk
Photograph "Bradford Northern after winning the Yorkshire Cup – Trevor Foster with the Cup Winning side. Trevor holds the cup and is flanked by Ken Traill and Bob Jenkins – 31/10/1953" at rlhp.co.uk

1923 births
2005 deaths
Auckland rugby union players
Bradford Bulls players
Expatriate rugby league players in England
King Country rugby union players
New Zealand expatriate rugby league players
New Zealand expatriate sportspeople in England
New Zealand international rugby union players
New Zealand rugby league players
New Zealand rugby union players
People educated at Thames High School
Rugby league players from Thames, New Zealand
Rugby league wingers
Rugby union players from Thames, New Zealand
Rugby union wings